Captain Nazi (Baron Albrecht Krieger) is a Fawcett Comics and DC Comics supervillain, and rival of Captain Marvel and Captain Marvel Jr.. 

Captain Nazi made his first live-action appearance in a 2016 second season episode of The CW TV series DC's Legends of Tomorrow, played by André Eriksen.

Publication history
Captain Nazi first appeared in Master Comics #21 (December 1941) and was created by William Woolfolk and Mac Raboy.

Fictional character biography

Fawcett Comics
The super-strong Captain Nazi was genetically altered by his scientist father, and developed into the "perfect specimen" to fight for Adolf Hitler and the Axis Powers during World War II. He is given superhuman strength and stamina, and a special flying gas allows him to fly. He is sent to battle American superheroes by the Nazis after his power is demonstrated to them by Hitler, and some of the heroes are shown. Nazi first appeared in Master Comics #21 (December 1941), in opposition to both Captain Marvel and Bulletman. During the second half of his battle with Marvel in Whiz Comics #25 (published the same month), Nazi attacks two innocent bystanders who happened to be fishing near the scene of the battle, after they pull him out of the lake, and he escapes in their boat. One of them, an old man named Jacob Freeman, is killed, but the old man's teenage grandson Freddy Freeman is saved by Captain Marvel. Although he is crippled and his back broken with a hit from an oar while Nazi escapes in the boat. Due to Captain Marvel bestowing part of his power to him, Freddy becomes Captain Marvel Jr. He is then sent to defeat Captain Nazi by Captain Marvel.

Junior, crippled in his Freddy Freeman form by the attack, continues to hold a vendetta against Nazi, and the two frequently battle one another. Nazi also serves as a member of Mister Mind's Monster Society of Evil, one of the most powerful organisations of villains in the world which included Adolf Hitler, and assists their first plan to steal magic fortune-telling pearls from a princess, leading Captain Marvel to their hideout, and revealing their existence, during the World War II years, before making his final Fawcett Comics appearance in the story "General Nippon's Elusive Earthplane", published in Captain Marvel, Jr. #19 in 1944.

DC Comics

Captain Nazi appeared only sporadically in DC Comics' 1970s/1980s revival of the Marvel Family characters under the title Shazam!, save for reprints of the original Fawcett stories. Nazi's first appearance in a new DC Comics story was in Shazam! #34 (March- April 1978).

Following writer Roy Thomas and artist Tom Mandrake's new interpretation of the Captain Marvel mythos in the 1987 four-issue miniseries Shazam!: The New Beginning, Captain Nazi was re-introduced in a 1988 four-part story in Action Comics Weekly issues #623-626. Captain Nazi himself, however, only appeared in #624-626. The story was written by Thomas and his wife Dann Thomas, with art by Rick Stasi and Rick Magyar. The new Captain Nazi is a young Neo-Nazi named Lester Abernathy. Abernathy is given his "Captain Nazi" powers, costume and codename by a Neo-Nazi organization called the Sons of Valhalla and battles Captain Marvel. This version of the character made no further appearances and was subsequently retconned out of existence by the 1994 The Power of Shazam! graphic novel, which again altered Captain Marvel's background and continuity.

Captain Nazi was introduced into the modern DC Universe in Jerry Ordway's The Power of Shazam! series in 1995. In the modern series, Nazi had been active during the 1940s, battling World War II-era heroes such as Bulletman, Minute-Man, and Spy Smasher, but placed himself in suspended animation in a chamber so that he could emerge in modern society and revive the Third Reich. He believed Hitler's body to be held in a similar chamber. Nazi's brother, scientist Wolf Krieger, and his granddaughter, a super-powered villainess named Madame Libertine who possesses mind-controlling powers, carry on Nazi's legacy in the 1990s and resurrect their hero from his suspended animation chamber in The Power of Shazam! #5.

Issues #6–8 of The Power of Shazam series retell the story of Captain Nazi's murdering Freddy's grandfather by throwing him a great distance with his superhuman strength, his crippling of Freddy, and Freddy's emergence as Marvel, Jr. and attempted revenge on Nazi. His life was actually saved by Freddy who believed the figure who fell into the lake was Captain Marvel, who had just knocked him into the lake. After the Marvel Family captures and defeats Nazi, he is sent to Europe to be tried for war crimes committed during World War II.

Captain Nazi eventually joins Lex Luthor's new Secret Society of Super Villains as seen in the miniseries Villains United where he works with them to torture the Secret Six. He is blinded during the escape of the Secret Six when Catman plunges syringes into his eyes.

Captain Nazi meets his apparent end in Batman #647 while fighting Batman and the Red Hood. The Captain, now sporting cybernetic eyes following his injury in Villains United, has been lent out to the villain Black Mask to assassinate the Red Hood alongside fellow Society members Deathstroke, Count Vertigo, and Hyena. During the fight, the Red Hood apparently kills Captain Nazi by jamming a taser-like weapon into his cybernetic eyes (the only vulnerable part of his body). In Villains United Special #1 however, Nazi has survived. At the behest of the Society, Nazi appeared in Kahndaq to release all of the captives in its prisons and fights Khandaq's ruler and former Secret Society member, Black Adam. During the battle, Black Adam confronts Nazi about how he seemingly survived being killed, at which time Captain Nazi cryptically proclaims that previous origins about him were wrong and that the villain is not even human; that he is the living avatar of National Socialism given physical form and that so long as there are Nazis in existence, he will exist. Captain Nazi was able to stalemate Black Adam in the battle afterwards.

He has since appeared as leader of a Nazi-themed team in Justice Society of America named "The Fourth Reich" after the "One Year Later" jump, and is an opponent of Wonder Woman in "The Circle", sporting a generic black costume.

In September 2011, DC Comics engaged in a line-wide revision of its superhero comics, including their stories and characters' fictional histories, known as The New 52. In the new stories, Captain Nazi first appears in the "Superman" storyline "Savage Dawn" in Superman (vol. 3) Annual #3. In 1941, Captain Nazi is genetically engineered to serve in Hitler's Aerospace program. Vandal Savage successfully convinces the Third Reich to build a rocket that Captain Nazi will use to pilot himself and Vandal Savage into outer space to collect a larger sample of the meteor that gave Savage his powers. When the ship faces turbulence, Captain Nazi opts to land instead of going forward with the mission. After a crash landing, an enraged Vandal Savage beats him until he stops moving.

Other versions

Flashpoint
In the alternate timeline of the Flashpoint event, Captain Nazi is a member of the H.I.V.E. council and represents Germany. He voted for using nuclear weapons to end the war in Western Europe between Aquaman and Wonder Woman. He appears much older here, possibly because he was not placed in suspended animation.

In other media
 A character similar to Captain Nazi appears in the Justice League Unlimited episode "Patriot Act". In a flashback, Spy Smasher stops him from taking a super-soldier serum that is later revealed to have been created for "Project Captain Nazi". Later, General Wade Eiling stole the serum from Cadmus Labs, transforming into a monster and going on a rampage in Metropolis. Seeking a battle with Superman, Eiling was instead confronted by seven members of the Justice League: Green Arrow, Speedy, Stargirl, S.T.R.I.P.E., Shining Knight, Vigilante, and Crimson Avenger (the line-up was roughly equivalent to the Seven Soldiers of Victory).
 Captain Nazi appears in the Legends of Tomorrow episode "The Justice Society of America", portrayed by André Eriksen. This version is an ally of Eobard Thawne, transformed into a monstrous self-proclaimed "Übermensch" by a biomolecular enhancer, the same that changed Nate Heywood into Steel. He fights the JSA and the time-travelling Legends, but is ultimately defeated by Nate and his grandfather Commander Steel/Henry Heywood.

References

External links
 Captain Nazi's "Who's Who" file at The Marvel Family Web

DC Comics characters with superhuman strength
DC Comics characters who can move at superhuman speeds
DC Comics male supervillains
Fawcett Comics supervillains
Nazi
DC Comics Nazis
DC Comics neo-Nazis
Golden Age supervillains
Comics characters introduced in 1941
National personifications in comic books
Captain Marvel (DC Comics)

de:Captain Marvel (DC Comics)#Captain Nazi